The Scheibe SF 33 (German: "hawk") is a German motorglider that was designed by Egon Scheibe in the 1970s.

Specifications

References

Further reading
 

1970s German sailplanes
Scheibe SF-33
Motor gliders
Single-engined tractor aircraft
Low-wing aircraft
Aircraft first flown in 1977